Kingston Township is an inactive township in Washington County, in the U.S. state of Missouri.

"Kingston" was a variant name of the community of Bliss.

References

Townships in Missouri
Townships in Washington County, Missouri